Georg (May 4, 1946 – ) is a Patagonic representational painter of urban and country scenes from his homes in Patagonia, Cordoba and Spain.
He studied under his father Konstantino with his brother Demetrio Miciu, and is well known as a patriarch and muse to several patagonic artists.

Georg is at the center of a milieu of important Patagonic painters, poets, and musicians including painters Iván Moricz Karl, Emiliano Céliz, Xunorus, FCP String Quartet, Emaús.

In 1995 Grinfeld Fine Arts opened the “Sala de Georg” in Palm Beach (Estados Unidos).

Biography
Austrian by birth and Patagonian by adoption was brought to Argentina, at age of 3, by his parents who had felt at close range the ravages of war in Europe. He spent his childhood among the Dunes of Gesell, instilling him with a love of nature. Many years and relocations later, he lived for a time in the region of City Bell, near Pereyra Iraola Park, where he explored the park's fascinating light and made numerous watercolor paintings.

His mother cultivated his taste for music, which led him to study at Gilardo Gilardi Conservatory of Music in La Plata, where maestro Adalberto Tortorella developed into him a well-rounded sense of what constitutes art.

Under the guidance of his father, he traveled and painted in the south of Argentina. On many other trips, he studied the great masters of art at museums and collections in South America, the United States, Canada, Mexico, the Middle East, and in Europe. Simultaneously, he perfected the technique of painting “au plein air” and adopted the palette knife as his primary painting tool. Georg opened solo shows in Jerusalem, Paris, Stuttgart, Barcelona, and Granada, showing works of Patagonia.

Married and with their first small children already born, Miciú took his family to live in Spain for four years where they exhibited works in various cities, sharing with people a reflection of Patagonia. Of special note during their stay were the paintings he made of pasturelands, animal herds, and the hidden corners of Andalucia, which today have disappeared from Granada.

Returning to Argentina, they settled in the Sierras of Córdoba. In 1990, Miciú worked with his friend and collaborator Jorge Bonzano to open “Sala de Georg” in Villa Giardino. They then moved to San Martin de los Andes. His work has since rotated around exhibitions in Rosario, Córdoba, Buenos Aires, Bariloche, Mar del Plata, and abroad in Granada, Almeria, and in San Francisco and Montecito in California- over 300 individual exhibitions.

In 1993, the exposition “Three Generations Miciu” opened in Villa Allenda, Córdoba, where his work was accompanied by works of his father, brother, and son Emaús. A variation on this exhibit later appeared in Buenos Aires at the National Museum of Decorative Art. That same year, he painted “Truchas y lupinos” (Trout and Lupines), an oil painting that marked a shift towards a different style. 
Two years later, Grinfeld Fine Arts opened a “Sala de Georg” in Palm Beach, Florida. Grinfeld also printed limited edition prints and lithographs, for wider distribution of his work.

In 2005, Grinfeld published “Georg,” a synthesis of his trajectory. A year later, Jorge Bonzano co-worked again to start the construction of the building that is, in a sense, the aim of his catalog.

References

External links
 Georg Miciu Website
 Coleccion Georg Museum official website
 'El pintor de la Patagonia' (La Nación, 4 Sept. 2005)

1946 births
Living people
Austrian painters
Argentine painters
Argentine male painters